The Skunk River is a  tributary of the Platte River in central Minnesota, United States. The Platte River, in turn, is a tributary of the Mississippi River.

See also
List of rivers of Minnesota
List of longest streams of Minnesota

References

External links
Minnesota Watersheds
USGS Hydrologic Unit Map - State of Minnesota (1974)

Rivers of Minnesota
Rivers of Morrison County, Minnesota
Tributaries of the Mississippi River